Nakul Singh Sawhney is an Indian documentary filmmaker.

He grew up in Delhi and attended Kirori Mal College in Delhi University. He was as active member of Players, the dramatic society of the college. He then completed a course in direction at the Film and Television Institute of India, Pune, during 2005-06. Nakul was also actively involved with Jana Natya Manch.

He is married to award-winning journalist Neha Dixit

He is currently making a film on the 2020-2021 farmers' protest, the largest and the longest protest in modern world history.

Notable works

Muzaffarnagar Baaqi Hai
His film 'Muzaffarnagar Baaqi hai that released in January 2015 is an extensively researched film on the sectarian violence in North India in September 2013, Muzaffarnagar riots, just a few months before the general elections in India. The film traces the economic, communal and sociological fallout of the violence that not just led to religious polarisation for political gains but also displaced hundreds of thousands of people.

The screening of the film was stopped by right wing fundamentalists from the Akhil Bhartiya Vidyarthi Parishad in Delhi University on 1 August 2015 where the filmmaker and the organisers including University professors were attacked. Following which over 200 protest screenings of the film were organised all across the country to mark dissent and support freedom of expression in India. Rohith Vemula, a Dalit PHd scholar, also screened the film in Hyderabad Central University on 4 August 2015 for which he was termed 'anti-national'.

The film has been extensively screened and appreciated in India and screened abroad including MIT, Columbia School of Journalism, SOAS, NYU and others. It was also selected by Mumbai International Film Festival and the International Film Festival of Kerala.

Izzatnagri ki Asabhya Betiyan
His film 'Izzatnagri ki Asabhya Betiyan' (Immoral Daughters in the Land of Honour) released in January 2012 traces the resistance of young women against honour killings and diktats of clan councils called Khap Panchayats in North India. The film explores caste, class and gender intersectionality in contemporary India. Another version of the same film 'Immoral Daughters' has been screened at several international film festivals.

Savitri's Sisters at Azadi Kooch
A short documentary on the how two Dalit women, Laxmiben and Madhuben, from rural Gujarat march to reclaim the land that rightfully belongs to Dalits, a community subjected to untouchability practices and acute socio-economic marginalisation . Released in 2017. Screened at Oxford University, Gottingen University, and others.

Kairana, After the Headlines
The film tries to look at the town of Kairana beyond the externally imposed binaries of Hindu-Muslim, and tries instead to look at the real issues that confronts the town. Released in 2016. Screened at several Universities in India and globally

With a Little Help from my Friends
He directed his first film in 2005, 'With a Little Help from my Friends', which won the award for the 2nd best film at the 60 Seconds to Fame film festival in Chennai.

Other works
At the Film Institute, he directed 'Agaurav' starring Divyendu Sharma and 'Undecided' that won awards for the 2nd Best Film and Best Director respectively at the Hyderabad International Film Festival. After completing his course, he made a feature-length documentary 'Once upon a time in Chheharta' on the history of the working class movement among the mill workers of Chheharta, Amritsar.

Chalchitra Abhiyaan
He founded Chalchitra Abhiyaan/Moving Images campaign in 2016. This film and media collective trains local people from marginalised communities in film technologies. The collective produces a range of video-based content prime among which are short-document films, news features, and live broadcasts. The goal is try to bring to the fore local issues from the grassroots that concern different marginalised communities in their own voices. The collective also organizes film and video screenings including international cinema and news features in remote villages in North India. It is followed by debate and discussion on the topic. Attended by hundreds of people weekly, this has built a regular, large offline viewership.

References

Year of birth missing (living people)
Living people
Delhi University alumni
Censorship in India
Indian documentary film directors
Film and Television Institute of India alumni